Yokoji Zen Mountain Center is a year-round Zen Buddhist training and retreat center located in the San Jacinto Mountains of Southern California.  It is a 160 acres (65 hectares) of sacred Native American land and wilderness.

Founded 1981 by Taizan Maezumi, Roshi as a summer retreat center for the Zen Center of Los Angeles.  Charles Tenshin Fletcher, Roshi who received Dharma transmission from Taizan Maezumi in the White Plum Zen Lineage is the teacher and abbot. His successor, David Jokai Blackwell, serves as vice-abbot.

When Yokoji Zen Mountain Center was founded, the formal name of the temple was Dounzan Yokoji.  Doun refers to the honorary founder, Shiomi Doun, Roshi; Zan means mountain; and Yokoji means sunlight temple.  Commonly the center was known by the name of Zen Mountain Center and in 2006 it returned to the lineage root name, Yokoji Zen Mountain Center to prevent confusion with other Zen centers.

Yokoji Zen Mountain Center is open to people in all spiritual traditions and walks of life.  The center has full-time residential training programs, as well as regularly scheduled silent meditation retreats (sesshin). Home practice is also supported by coming to the center for periods of intensive practice as well and local practice with one of the affiliated sitting groups.  Affiliated sitting groups are located in:

 Los Angeles, California
 Pasadena, California
 Long Beach, California
 Boca Raton, Florida
 Mexico City, Mexico
 Liverpool, England
 Wellington, New Zealand
 Mendoza, Argentina

The buildings and grounds of the center were developed with ecological principles in concept and construction.  It is an alternative power community and serves as the ecological model for the EarthWitness Foundation.

Gallery

See also
Buddhism in the United States
Timeline of Zen Buddhism in the United States

References

External links
 Yokoji Zen Mountain Center (http://zmc.org)

White Plum Asanga
Zen centers in California
Buddhist temples in California
Religious buildings and structures in Riverside County, California